{{Location map many | Western Cape | width = 250 | float = right | border = | caption = {{center|Trail start and finish}} | alt = | relief = | AlternativeMap = 
| 
| label1   = Start | label1_size = 95 | position1  = bottom | background1 =  
| mark1    = Red pog.svg | mark1size = 6 | link1  =  
| lat1_deg = 34 | lat1_min = 01 | lat1_sec = 15.5 | lat1_dir    =  S
| lon1_deg = 23 | lon1_min = 52 | lon1_sec = 47.5 | lon1_dir    =  E
|  
| label2   = Finish | label2_size = 95 | position2  = left | background2 =  
| mark2    = Red pog.svg  | mark2size = 6 | link2  =  
| lat2_deg = 33 | lat2_min = 58 | lat2_sec = 56 | lat2_dir    =  S
| lon2_deg = 23 | lon2_min = 34 | lon2_sec = 36 | lon2_dir    =  E
}}

The Otter Trail''' is a hiking trail along the Garden Route coast of South Africa and is named for the Cape clawless otter which occurs in this region. This trail is widely regarded as one of the finest in the world and stretches from Storms River Mouth in the east to Nature's Valley in the west, is 26 km long as the crow flies and 44 km as the hiker walks. Walking the trail takes 5 days, and the 4 nights are spent in comfortable huts with superb views. The route is located entirely within the Tsitsikamma National Park, which protects an 80 km long strip of coastal mountains, forest and beaches. 

The trail traverses a very scenic landscape, never straying far from the shoreline, but often climbing steeply and then descending to the beach or a river crossing. Vegetation along the way is either fynbos, dense gallery forest or open, rocky sections near the sea with an abundance of wildflowers.

Trail landmarks
 Storms River Mouth 
 Ngubu huts 
 Oakhurst huts 
 Scott hut 
 André huts 
 Grootrivier, Nature's Valley

Trail stages
 
 Day 1 - 4.8 km (± 2 hours) Storms River Mouth - Ngubu
 Day 2 - 7.9 km (± 4 hours) Ngubu - Scott 
 Day 3 - 7.7 km (± 4 hours) Scott - Oakhurst 
 Day 4 - 13.8 km (± 6 hours) Oakhurst - André 
 Day 5 - 9.8 km (previously 6.8 km) (± 3 hours) André - Nature's Valley
 Total distance 44 km

Elevation distances - vertical climb and descent
 
 Day 1 - 561 m total vertical - Climb 188 m  - Descent -373 m
 Day 2 - 1480 m total vertical - Climb 746 m  - Descent -734 m  
 Day 3 - 1257 m total vertical - Climb 623 m  - Descent -634 m  
 Day 4 - 1905 m total vertical - Climb 945 m  - Descent -960 m  
 Day 5 - 926 m total vertical - Climb 466 m  - Descent -460 m 
 Total elevation distance 6.13 km

Gallery

See also
 South African National Parks

References

 Official site at South African National Parks
 General Information on the Otter Trail

External links 
 Download - Google Earth trail route KMZ file
 SANPARKS - Otter trail page
 - The Otter Trail Guide
- The Otter Trail Run page
 - Otter Hiking Trail

Hiking trails in South Africa